John William Mahoney (December 28, 1926 – September 30, 2006) was a lawyer, judge and politician in Newfoundland, Canada. He represented Harbour Main in the Newfoundland House of Assembly from 1966 to 1971.

The son of Thomas Mahoney and Anne Victoria O'Toole, he was born in St. John's and was educated in Conception Harbour, at Saint Bonaventure's College and at Memorial University College. He was called to the Newfoundland bar in 1951, practised privately and then served as prosecutor for the Department of Justice from 1953 to 1966. In 1964, he was named Queen's Counsel.

Mahoney married Carmel J. Galway; the couple had six children.

He was elected to the Newfoundland assembly in 1966 and served in the provincial cabinet as Minister of Justice. He was defeated when he ran for reelection in 1971. He returned to the practice of law and then, in 1975, was named to the trial division of the Supreme Court of Newfoundland. In 1982, he was named to the Appeals division of the Supreme Court.

He died in St. John's at the age of 79.

Mahoney was an uncle of former Newfoundland premier Danny Williams.

References 

1926 births
2006 deaths
Judges in Newfoundland and Labrador
Liberal Party of Newfoundland and Labrador MHAs
Members of the Executive Council of Newfoundland and Labrador
Politicians from St. John's, Newfoundland and Labrador